HD 175167 b is an extra-solar planet orbiting HD 175167, which is a G type star within the Pavo constellation around 219 light years away from the Earth. The planet was discovered by the Magellan Planet Search Program as the astronomical object fit the Keplerian orbital model. During the observations 13 doppler velocity tests were conducted, which showed this object's mass was at least 7.8 Jovian-masses and its orbit has a high eccentricity. The exoplanet takes 3.53 years to complete a full stellar orbit.

An astrometric measurement of the planet's inclination and true mass was published in 2022 as part of Gaia DR3.

See also
 HD 129445 b
 HD 152079 b
 HD 164604 b
 HD 86226 b

References 

Exoplanets discovered in 2010
Exoplanets detected by radial velocity
Exoplanets detected by astrometry
Giant planets
Pavo (constellation)